Vitalia Pavlicenco (born October 29, 1953 in Grinăuţi) is a Moldavian politician. She was the head of the National Liberal Party (Moldova).

Biography 
Vitalia Pavlicenco was born on October 29, 1953, in Grinăuţi. She grew up without a father because her father Victor Vangheli, a math and history teacher at the village school, was killed on June 26, 1953, at the age of 24, four months before Vitalia was born. Her mother, Agafia Vangheli, was a teacher of Romanian and French.

After the collapse of the USSR, Vitalia Pavlicenco became the first deputy director general of the National Press Agency "Moldova-Pres" (1990-1994) and then editor-in-chief of Mesagerul (1994-1998).

Political life 
She served as member of the Parliament of Moldova (1998–2001, 2005–2009). She also held the positions of vice-president of the Union of Journalists from the Republic of Moldova and vice-president of the Romanian World Council.

Personal life 
Vitalia Pavlicenco is married to Sergiu Pavlicenco, a hispanist professor at the State University of Moldova. The two have a daughter together, Beatriz Pavlicenco who is a violinist and lives in Germany.
 At one point, the Pavlicenco family lived in Cuba, where their daughter, Beatriz, was also born.

External links 
 Traversând Basarabia
 Parlamentul Republicii Moldova
  List of candidates to the position of deputy in the Parliament of the Republic of Moldova for parliamentary elections of 6 March, 2005 of the Electoral Bloc “Moldova Democrata”
 List of deputies elected in the March 6 parliamentary elections
 Lista deputaţilor aleşi la 6 martie 2005 în Parlamentul Republicii Moldova

References

1953 births
Living people
Moldovan female MPs
Moldovan MPs 2005–2009
Electoral Bloc Democratic Moldova MPs
National Liberal Party (Moldova) politicians
21st-century Moldovan women politicians
Moldovan philologists
Women philologists